The 2016–17 New York Islanders season was the 45th season in the franchise's history. It was their second season in the Barclays Center in the New York City borough of Brooklyn, which they moved into after leaving Nassau Coliseum in Nassau County on Long Island at the conclusion of the 2014–15 season. The Islanders attempted to improve upon their 45–27–10 record from the previous season, in which they defeated the Florida Panthers to win their first playoff series since 1993, but fell to the Tampa Bay Lightning in five games in the second round. However, they were unable to accomplish this as they finished the season with a 41–29–12 record, missing the playoffs by one point to the Toronto Maple Leafs.

Standings

Schedule and results

Pre-season

|- style="background:#cfc;"
| 1 || September 26 || Philadelphia || 1–4 || NY Islanders || || Berube|| — || 1–0–0 || 
|- style="background:#fcc;"
| 2 || September 27 || NY Islanders || 0–4 || Philadelphia || || Gibson || 17,721 || 1–1–0 || 
|- style="background:#fcc;"
| 3 || September 27 || NY Islanders || 2–5 || NY Rangers || || Berube || 17,228 || 1–2–0 || 
|- style="background:#fcc;"
| 4 || October 1 || Washington || 2–1 || NY Islanders || || Berube || –– || 1–3–0 || 
|- style="background:#cfc;"
| 5 || October 3 || New Jersey || 3–4 || NY Islanders || || Greiss || 5,978 || 2–3–0 || 
|- style="background:#cfc;"
| 6 || October 4 || NY Rangers || 2–3 || NY Islanders || OT || Berube || 10,244 || 3–3–0 || 
|- style="background:#cfc;"
| 7 || October 5 || NY Islanders || 3–2 || New Jersey || || Greiss || 7,714 || 4–3–0 || 
|- style="background:#fcc;"
| 8 || October 9 || NY Islanders || 0–4 || Washington || || Halak || 14,329 || 4–4–0 || 
|-
| colspan="11" style="text-align:left;"|  – indicates split-squad game. – game played at Webster Bank Arena in Bridgeport, Connecticut.
|-
| colspan="11" style="text-align:center;"|
Legend:

Regular season

|- style="background:#fcc;"
| 1 || October 13 || NY Islanders || 3–5 || NY Rangers || || Halak || 18,200 || 0–1–0 || 0 || 
|- style="background:#fcc;"
| 2 || October 15 || NY Islanders || 1–2 || Washington || || Greiss || 18,506 || 0–2–0 || 0 || 
|- style="background:#cfc;"
| 3 || October 16 || Anaheim || 2–3 || NY Islanders || OT || Halak || 15,795 || 1–2–0 || 2 || 
|- style="background:#fcc;"
| 4 || October 18 || San Jose || 3–2 || NY Islanders || || Halak || 10,772 || 1–3–0 || 2 || 
|- style="background:#cfc;"
| 5 || October 21 || Arizona || 2–3 || NY Islanders || || Halak || 13,076 || 2–3–0 || 4 || 
|- style="background:#cfc;"
| 6 || October 23 || Minnesota || 3–6 || NY Islanders || || Greiss || 11,583 || 3–3–0 || 6 || 
|- style="background:#fcc;"
| 7 || October 26 || Montreal || 3–2 || NY Islanders || || Greiss || 12,194 || 3–4–0 || 6 || 
|- style="background:#fcc;"
| 8 || October 27 || NY Islanders || 2–4 || Pittsburgh || || Halak || 18,422 || 3–5–0 || 6 || 
|- style="background:#cfc;"
| 9 || October 30 || Toronto || 1–5 || NY Islanders || || Greiss || 12,057 || 4–5–0 || 8 || 
|-

|- style="background:#fcc;"
| 10 || November 1 || Tampa Bay || 6–1 || NY Islanders || || Greiss || 10,822 || 4–6–0 || 8 || 
|- style="background:#fff;"
| 11 || November 3 || Philadelphia || 3–2 || NY Islanders || SO || Halak || 11,119 || 4–6–1 || 9 || 
|- style="background:#fff;"
| 12 || November 5 || Edmonton || 4–3 || NY Islanders || SO || Halak || 13,862 || 4–6–2 || 10 || 
|- style="background:#cfc;"
| 13 || November 7 || Vancouver || 2–4 || NY Islanders || || Halak || 12,514 || 5–6–2 || 12 || 
|- style="background:#fcc;"
| 14 || November 10 || NY Islanders || 1–4 || Tampa Bay || || Halak || 19,092 || 5–7–2 || 12 || 
|- style="background:#fff;"
| 15 || November 12 || NY Islanders || 2–3 || Florida || OT || Halak || 15,828 || 5–7–3 || 13 || 
|- style="background:#fcc;"
| 16 || November 14 || Tampa Bay || 4–0 || NY Islanders || || Halak || 12,498 || 5–8–3 || 13 || 
|- style="background:#fff;"
| 17 || November 18 || Pittsburgh || 3–2 || NY Islanders || OT || Halak || 13,365 || 5–8–4 || 14 || 
|- style="background:#cfc;"
| 18 || November 22 || NY Islanders || 3–2 || Anaheim || SO || Greiss || 15,161 || 6–8–4 || 16 || 
|- style="background:#fcc;"
| 19 || November 23 || NY Islanders || 2–4 || Los Angeles || || Halak || 18,230 || 6–9–4 || 16 || 
|- style="background:#fcc;"
| 20 || November 25 || NY Islanders || 2–3 || San Jose || || Greiss || 17,562 || 6–10–4 || 16 || 
|- style="background:#cfc;"
| 21 || November 28 || Calgary || 1–2 || NY Islanders || OT || Greiss || 10,772 || 7–10–4 || 18 || 
|- style="background:#cfc;"
| 22 || November 30 || Pittsburgh|| 3–5 || NY Islanders || || Greiss || 12,149 || 8–10–4 || 20 || 
|-

|- style="background:#cfc;"
| 23 || December 1 || NY Islanders || 3–0 || Washington || || Halak || 18,506 || 9–10–4 || 22 || 
|- style="background:#fff;"
| 24 || December 4 || Detroit || 4-3 || NY Islanders || OT || Halak || 13,789 || 9–10–5 || 23 || 
|- style="background:#cfc;"
| 25 || December 6 || NY Rangers || 2–4 || NY Islanders || || Halak || 15,795 || 10–10–5 || 25 || 
|- style="background:#cfc;"
| 26 || December 8 || St. Louis || 2–3 || NY Islanders || || Greiss || 11,178 || 11–10–5 || 27 || 
|- style="background:#fcc;"
| 27 || December 10 || NY Islanders || 2–6 || Columbus || || Halak || 16,928 || 11–11–5 || 27 || 
|- style="background:#fcc;"
| 28 || December 13 || Washington || 4–2 || NY Islanders || || Halak || 12,730 || 11–12–5 || 27 || 
|- style="background:#fcc;"
| 29 || December 15 || Chicago || 5–4 || NY Islanders || || Greiss || 12,504 || 11–13–5 || 27 || 
|- style="background:#fff;"
| 30 || December 16 || NY Islanders || 2–3 || Buffalo || OT || Berube || 18,903 || 11–13–6 || 28 || 
|- style="background:#fcc;"
| 31 || December 18 || Ottawa || 6–2 || NY Islanders || || Berube || 13,102 || 11–14–6 || 28 || 
|- style="background:#cfc;"
| 32 || December 20 || NY Islanders || 4–2 || Boston || || Greiss || 17,565 || 12–14–6 || 30 || 
|- style="background:#cfc;"
| 33 || December 23 || Buffalo || 1–5 || NY Islanders || || Greiss || 13,852 || 13–14–6 || 32 || 
|- style="background:#cfc;"
| 34 || December 27 || Washington || 3–4 || NY Islanders || || Halak || 15,795 || 14–14–6 || 34 || 
|- style="background:#fcc;"
| 35 || December 29 || NY Islanders || 4–6 || Minnesota || || Berube || 19,252 || 14–15–6 || 34 || 
|- style="background:#cfc;"
| 36 || December 31 || NY Islanders || 6–2 || Winnipeg || || Greiss || 15,294 || 15–15–6 || 36 || 
|-

|- style="background:#fff;"
| 37 || January 6 || NY Islanders || 1–2 || Colorado || OT || Greiss || 14,788 || 15–15–7 || 37 || 
|- style="background:#fff;"
| 38 || January 7 || NY Islanders || 1–2 || Arizona || SO || Greiss || 12,380 || 15–15–8 || 38 || 
|- style="background:#fcc;"
| 39 || January 11 || Florida || 2–1 || NY Islanders || || Greiss || 13,529 || 15–16–8 || 38 || 
|- style="background:#cfc;"
| 40 || January 13 || NY Islanders || 5–2 || Florida || || Greiss || 14,352 || 16–16–8 || 40 || 
|- style="background:#fcc;"
| 41 || January 14 || NY Islanders || 4–7 || Carolina || || Greiss || 16,640 || 16–17–8 || 40 || 
|- style="background:#cfc;"
| 42 || January 16 || NY Islanders || 4–0 || Boston || || Greiss || 17,565 || 17–17–8 || 42 || 
|- style="background:#cfc;"
| 43 || January 19 || Dallas || 0–3 || NY Islanders || || Greiss || 12,630 || 18–17–8 || 44 || 
|- style="background:#cfc;"
| 44 || January 21 || Los Angeles || 2–4 || NY Islanders || || Berube || 15,138 || 19–17–8 || 46 || 
|- style="background:#fff;"
| 45 || January 22 || Philadelphia || 3–2 || NY Islanders || OT || Greiss || 13,146 || 19–17–9 || 47 || 
|- style="background:#cfc;"
| 46 || January 24 || Columbus || 2–4 || NY Islanders || || Greiss || 11,419 || 20–17–9 || 49 || 
|- style="background:#cfc;"
| 47 || January 26 || Montreal || 1–3 || NY Islanders || || Greiss || 12,019 || 21–17–9 || 51 || 
|- style="background:#bbcaff;"
|colspan="2" | January 27–29 ||colspan="10" | All-Star Break in Los Angeles
|- style="background:#cfc;"
| 48 || January 31 || Washington || 2–3 || NY Islanders || || Greiss || 11,240 || 22–17–9 || 53 || 
|-

|- style="background:#fcc;"
| 49 || February 3 || NY Islanders || 4–5 || Detroit || || Greiss || 20,027 || 22–18–9 || 53 || 
|- style="background:#fff;"
| 50 || February 4 || Carolina || 5–4 || NY Islanders || OT || Berube || 14,153 || 22–18–10 || 54 || 
|- style="background:#cfc;"
| 51 || February 6 || Toronto || 5–6 || NY Islanders || OT || Greiss || 11,828 || 23–18–10 || 56 || 
|- style="background:#cfc;"
| 52 || February 9 || NY Islanders || 3–1 || Philadelphia || || Greiss || 19,737 || 24–18–10 || 58 || 
|- style="background:#fcc;"
| 53 || February 11 || NY Islanders || 0–3 || Ottawa || || Greiss || 18,211 || 24–19–10 || 58 || 
|- style="background:#cfc;"
| 54 || February 12 || Colorado || 1–5 || NY Islanders || || Berube || 14,107 || 25–19–10 || 60 || 
|- style="background:#fcc;"
| 55 || February 14 || NY Islanders || 1–7 || Toronto || || Greiss || 18,956 || 25–20–10 || 60 || 
|- style="background:#cfc;"
| 56 || February 16 || NY Rangers || 2–4 || NY Islanders || || Greiss || 15,795 || 26–20–10 || 62 || 
|- style="background:#fcc;"
| 57 || February 18 || NY Islanders || 2–3 || New Jersey || || Greiss || 16,514 || 26–21–10 || 62 || 
|- style="background:#cfc;"
| 58 || February 19 || New Jersey || 4–6 || NY Islanders || || Berube || 15,795 || 27–21–10 || 64 || 
|- style="background:#cfc;"
| 59 || February 21 || NY Islanders || 3–1 || Detroit || || Greiss || 20,027 || 28–21–10 || 66 || 
|- style="background:#cfc;"
| 60 || February 23 || NY Islanders || 3–0 || Montreal || || Greiss || 21,288 || 29–21–10 || 68 || 
|- style="background:#fcc;"
| 61 || February 25 || NY Islanders || 0–7 || Columbus || || Greiss || 18,183 || 29–22–10 || 68 || 
|-

|- style="background:#cfc;"
| 62 || March 2 || NY Islanders || 5–4 || Dallas || || Greiss || 17,438 || 30–22–10 || 70 || 
|- style="background:#fff;"
| 63 || March 3 || NY Islanders || 1–2 || Chicago || SO || Greiss || 21,883 || 30–22–11 || 71 || 
|- style="background:#fcc;"
| 64 || March 5 || NY Islanders || 2–5 || Calgary || || Greiss || 18,741 || 30–23–11 || 71 || 
|- style="background:#cfc;"
| 65 || March 7 || NY Islanders || 4–1 || Edmonton || || Greiss || 18,347 || 31–23–11 || 73 || 
|- style="background:#cfc;"
| 66 || March 9 || NY Islanders || 4–3 || Vancouver || OT || Greiss || 18,406 || 32–23–11 || 75 || 
|- style="background:#fcc;"
| 67 || March 11 || NY Islanders || 3–4 || St. Louis || || Greiss || 19,505 || 32–24–11 || 75 || 
|- style="background:#fcc;"
| 68 || March 13 || Carolina || 8–4 || NY Islanders || || Greiss || 12,785 || 32–25–11 || 75 || 
|- style="background:#cfc;"
| 69 || March 14 || NY Islanders || 3–2 || Carolina || OT || Greiss || 8,707 || 33–25–11 || 77 || 
|- style="background:#fcc;"
| 70 || March 16 || Winnipeg || 4–2 || NY Islanders || || Greiss || 13,700 || 33–26–11 || 77 || 
|- style="background:#fff;"
| 71 || March 18 || Columbus || 3–2 || NY Islanders || OT || Greiss || 14,007 || 33–26–12 || 78 || 
|- style="background:#cfc"
| 72 || March 22 || NY Islanders || 3–2 || NY Rangers || || Greiss || 18,006 || 34–26–12 || 80 || 
|- style="background:#cfc;"
| 73 || March 24 || NY Islanders || 4–3 || Pittsburgh || SO || Halak || 18,659 || 35–26–12 || 82 || 
|- style="background:#fcc;"
| 74 || March 25 || Boston || 2–1 || NY Islanders || || Greiss || 15,795 || 35–27–12 || 82 || 
|- style="background:#fcc;"
| 75 || March 27 || Nashville || 3–1 || NY Islanders || || Greiss || 11,671 || 35–28–12 || 82 || 
|- style="background:#fcc;"
| 76 || March 30 || NY Islanders || 3–6 || Philadelphia || || Halak || 19,703 || 35–29–12 || 82 || 
|- style="background:#cfc;"
| 77 || March 31 || New Jersey || 1–2 || NY Islanders || || Halak || 13,766 || 36–29–12 || 84 || 
|-

|- style="background:#cfc"
| 78 || April 2 || NY Islanders || 4–2 || Buffalo || || Halak || 19,070 || 37–29–12 || 86 || 
|- style="background:#cfc;"
| 79 || April 4 || NY Islanders || 2–1 || Nashville || OT || Halak || 17,113 || 38–29–12 || 88 || 
|- style="background:#cfc;"
| 80 || April 6 || NY Islanders || 3–0 || Carolina || || Halak || 9,769 || 39–29–12 || 90 || 
|- style="background:#cfc;"
| 81 || April 8 || NY Islanders || 4–2 || New Jersey || || Halak || 16,514 || 40–29–12 || 92 || 
|- style="background:#cfc;"
| 82 || April 9 || Ottawa || 2–4 || NY Islanders || || Greiss || 13,303 || 41–29–12 || 94 || 
|-

|-
|
Legend:

Player statistics
Final Stats
Skaters

Goaltenders

†Denotes player spent time with another team before joining the Islanders. Stats reflect time with the Islanders only.
‡Denotes player was traded mid-season. Stats reflect time with the Islanders only.
Bold/italics denotes franchise record.

Awards and honours

Awards

Milestones

Transactions
Following the end of the Islanders' 2015–16 season, and during the 2016–17 season, this team has been involved in the following transactions:

Trades

Free agents acquired

Free agents lost

Claimed via waivers

Lost via waivers

Player signings

Draft picks

Below are the New York Islanders' selections at the 2016 NHL Entry Draft, held June 24–25, 2016 at the First Niagara Center in Buffalo, New York.

Draft notes
 The New York Islanders' second-round pick went to the Boston Bruins as the result of a trade on October 4, 2014 that sent Johnny Boychuk to New York in exchange for Philadelphia's second-round pick in 2015, a conditional third-round pick in 2015 and this pick.
 The New York Islanders' third-round pick went to the New Jersey Devils as the result of a trade on June 24, 2016 that sent a first-round pick in 2016 (11th overall) to Ottawa in exchange for a first-round pick in 2016 (12th overall) and this pick.
Ottawa previously acquired this pick as the result of a trade on February 29, 2016 that sent Shane Prince and a seventh-round pick in 2016 to New York in exchange for this pick (being conditional at the time of the trade). The condition – Ottawa will receive the lower of New York or Vancouver's third-round pick in 2016 – was converted on March 25, 2016 when the Canucks were eliminated from playoff contention ensuring that they would finish behind the Islanders in the overall league standings.
  The Columbus Blue Jackets' fourth-round pick went to the New York Islanders as the result of a trade on June 25, 2016 that sent a fourth-round pick in 2016 (110th overall) and a sixth-round pick in 2017 to Chicago in exchange for this pick.
Chicago previously acquired this pick as the result of a trade on June 30, 2015 that sent Brandon Saad, Michael Paliotta and Alex Broadhurst to Columbus in exchange for Artem Anisimov, Jeremy Morin, Corey Tropp, Marko Dano and this pick.
 The New York Islanders' fourth-round pick went to Chicago Blackhawks as the result of a trade on June 25, 2016 that sent Columbus' fourth-round pick in 2016 (95th overall) to New York in exchange for a sixth-round pick in 2017 and this pick.
  The San Jose Sharks' fourth-round pick went to the New York Islanders as the result of a trade on June 25, 2016 that sent a fourth-round pick in 2017 to Philadelphia in exchange for this pick.
Philadelphia previously acquired this pick as the result of a trade on June 27, 2015 that sent Nicklas Grossmann and Chris Pronger to Arizona in exchange for Sam Gagner and this pick (being conditional at the time of the trade). The condition – Philadelphia will receive a fourth-round pick in 2016 if Arizona acquires another fourth-round pick in 2016, at Arizona's choice – was converted on June 25, 2016.
Arizona previously acquired this pick as the result of a trade on June 20, 2016 that sent Maxim Letunov and a sixth-round pick in 2017 to San Jose in exchange for Detroit's third-round pick in 2017 and this pick.
 The New York Islanders' fifth-round pick went to the Vancouver Canucks  as the result of a trade on May 25, 2016 that sent Jared McCann, a second and fourth-round pick both in 2016 to Florida in exchange for Erik Gudbranson and this pick.
Florida previously acquired this pick as the result of a trade on June 27, 2015 that sent Montreal's fifth-round pick in 2015 to New York in exchange for this pick.
  The Ottawa Senators' seventh-round pick went to the New York Islanders as the result of a trade on February 29, 2016 that sent a conditional third-round pick in 2016 to Ottawa in exchange for Shane Prince and this pick.

References

New York Islanders seasons
New York Islanders
New York Islanders
New York Islanders
New York Islanders
2010s in Brooklyn
Prospect Heights, Brooklyn